Tvistein Lighthouse is a coastal lighthouse in the municipality of Larvik in Vestfold og Telemark, Norway.

See also

 List of lighthouses in Norway
 Lighthouses in Norway

References

External links
 
 Norsk Fyrhistorisk Forening 

Lighthouses completed in 1908
Lighthouses in Vestfold og Telemark
1908 establishments in Norway